Nand Kishore Yadav (born 26 August 1953) is an Indian politician, former cabinet minister for road construction and health in the Government of Bihar. He is a member of the Bharatiya Janata Party (BJP) and member of Rashtriya Swayamsevak Sangh (RSS). He is a senior BJP leader who joined, as minister, the Bihar Government after the split of the Mahagathbandhan and parting of ways between Lalu's RJD and Nitish Kumar's JDU in June 2013. Before that, he was cabinet minister for road construction and tourism and the leader of the opposition in the Bihar Assembly, at present Chairman- Prakalan Samiti (Bihar Vidhan Sabha).

Family background, early life and education
Yadav was born on 26 August 1953 to the Panna Lal Yadav and Rajkumari Yadav. His great-grandfather, Jhalo Sardar, was a landlord. It is said that he used to pet lions. His grandfather, Ramdas Rai, spent the family inheritance, mainly on keeping and breeding birds. (Yadav is quoted as saying,  "Hum sher se chidiyon per aagaye"). His father had to restart from scratch and set up a business in the Khajekalan area of old Patna, where he was born and spent his childhood.

See also
List of politicians from Bihar

References
 
 "BJP dubs RJD's 'Bihar Bandh' as total failure", The Economic Times, 27 July 2015
 "BJP slams Nitish for taking sole credit for performance", The Free Press Journal, 27 July 2015
 "True, more than one CM face in Bihar BJP, says Nand Kishore Yadav", The Indian Express, 13 April 2015

External links
 
 Bihar Legislative Assembly
 Bhartiya Janata Party

Bharatiya Janata Party politicians from Bihar
Living people
People from Bihar
State cabinet ministers of Bihar
Leaders of the Opposition in the Bihar Legislative Assembly
1953 births
Bihari politicians
Bihar MLAs 2020–2025